Untouched is the second studio album of American girl group The Emotions released in 1971 by Stax Records.

Overview
Untouched was produced by Isaac Hayes, Ronnie Williams and David Porter. Artists such as the Bar-Kays also appeared on the album.

Singles
The single "Show Me How" peaked at No. 13 on the Billboard Best-Selling Soul Singles chart.

Samples
 "Blind Alley" has been sampled by several artists such as 112, A Tribe Called Quest, Bell Biv Devoe, Big Daddy Kane, Brand Nubian, Craig Mack, EPMD, Gangstarr, Ice Cube, Jadakiss, Mariah Carey and Redman.
 "If You Think It (You May As Well Do It)" was sampled by Raekwon.

Track listing

References

1972 albums
The Emotions albums
Volt Records albums
Albums produced by Isaac Hayes